A stepped profile describes the edge of something that has a series of defined steps. It has applications in architecture, construction, engineering, and geology.

Applications

Architecture and construction
In building design a stepped profile is used to reduce the visual impact of, or airborne noise around a building. A stepped profile is also used to calculate seismic and wind loads in multi-story building design.

The spillway from a dam can have a stepped profile, which dissipates energy from the released water.

Engineering
In engineering, a stepped profile may be used on a bearing surface to reduce friction between the moving parts.

Geology
A mountain with a stepped profile has a number of denudation terraces caused by erosion.

A river with a stepped profile has a step-like variation in its gradient along its length. This may be caused by changes in the height of the underlying bedrock.

Notable examples
 Altar Mountain, a mountain in Victoria Land, Antarctica
 Drapers' Gardens, an office block in the City of London, United Kingdom
 Cairn of Barnenez, a neolithic monument in Brittany, France

See also
 Setback (architecture)
 Stepped spillway

References

Architectural elements
Engineering
Geology
Metalworking terminology